Sword of Freedom was a 1958 drama adventure series for a family audience.  Like several of its predecessors (most notably The Adventures of Robin Hood), it was produced by Sapphire Films for ITC Entertainment and fitted into the same swashbuckler genre as previous productions. It ran for 39 half-hour monochrome episodes.

Plot
Marco del Monte is a young Republican artist living in sixteenth century Renaissance Florence. The city is ruled by the tyrant Duke de Medici. Marco's girlfriend is Angelica, a beautiful former pickpocket. Sandro is Marco's friend and confidant. Machiavelli is the Duke's advisor, and Captain Rodrigo is the head of the Medici forces. The series depicts the struggles of the Republicans to combat the attempts of the Duke to strengthen his position and make himself a dictator.

Cast and characters
 Edmund Purdom as Marco del Monte
 Adrienne Corri as Angelica
 Roland Bartrop as Sandro
 Martin Benson as the Duke de Medici
 Kenneth Hyde as Machiavelli

Recurring characters
 Derek Sydney as Captain Rodrigo
 Monica Stevenson as Francesca de Medici (De Medici's sister)
 Andrew Keir Edward Atienza as Leonardo da Vinci
 Kevin Stoney as Niccolo the innkeeper
Guest stars included Joan Plowright, Peter Wyngarde, Charles Gray, Paul Eddington, Brian Nissen, Patrick Troughton, Kenneth Williams and Roger Delgado.

Episodes
Airdate is for ATV Midlands  ITV regions varied date and order. Production order as the Network DVD.

Filmed during 1957–1958. Production Nos 101, 117–139 at Walton Studios, Walton on Thames, England and 102–108 at Alliance Film Studios, Twickenham, England

Series 1 (1958)

Series 2 (1960–1961)

Music
The theme music to Sword of Freedom was composed by Eric Spear, more famous for his theme for Coronation Street.

DVD
Network released the series on a 5-disc region 2 DVD set in June 2010.

References

External links
 
 British Film Institute

1958 British television series debuts
1961 British television series endings
1950s British drama television series
1960s British drama television series
Television series by ITC Entertainment
ITV television dramas
Television shows set in Italy
British adventure television series
Black-and-white British television shows
English-language television shows
Television shows set in Florence